Inno nazionale means "national anthem" in Italian. It may refer to:

"Il Canto degli Italiani", the national anthem of Italy
"Inno Nazionale della Repubblica", the national anthem of San Marino